Temple Ahavat Shalom Northridge is a Reform Jewish congregation located in Southern California's north San Fernando Valley community of Northridge, at Chimineas Ave. & Rinaldi Pl. TAS Northridge is affiliated with the Union for Reform Judaism.

History  
TAS Northridge was established in 1965 as the result of a merger between two other Reform synagogues in the north San Fernando Valley: Temple Beth Torah and the North Valley Reform Congregation. "Ahavat shalom" is Hebrew for "love of peace." Land was purchased to the south of the future path of California State Route 118 (Ronald Reagan Freeway), and a temporary multi-purpose building was erected in 1969. The founding rabbis were Fred Krinsky and Shimon Paskow. They were succeeded by Rabbi Allen Secher, who served from 1967 to 1971 and was the first member of the clergy to introduce multi-media worship to the synagogue experience.

Rabbi Secher was followed in the pulpit in 1971 by Rabbi Richard Leviton, and in 1973 by Rabbi Solomon F. Kleinman. Among Rabbi Kleinman's major accomplishments were the establishment of a preschool and the completion of a sanctuary-social hall complex to coincide with Rosh Hashanah and Yom Kippur in 1978. The ark, which contains a Torah rescued from the Holocaust, was designed by artist Joseph Young, who is perhaps best known for designing the Triforium in downtown Los Angeles. One of Rabbi Kleinman's rabbinic interns from Hebrew Union College-Jewish Institute of Religion was Denise Eger. In 2015, Rabbi Eger became the first member of the LGBT community to head the Central Conference of American Rabbis, the professional organization of Reform rabbis in the United States and Canada.

After Rabbi Kleinman retired in 1986, he served as rabbi emeritus until his death in 2015 at age 95. Rabbi Kleinman was succeeded as senior rabbi in 1986 by Jerald M. Brown. Rabbi Brown inspired the building of an education center, introduced confirmation for 11th graders, and initiated Tuesday morning Torah study, which continues to the present day. Rabbi Barry M. Lutz, who became the temple's senior rabbi in 2008 and led congregational trips to Israel and sites of Jewish historical interest in Central Europe, left TAS Northridge in 2017 to pursue other interests. Two interim rabbis followed: Rabbi Liat Yardeni-Funk from January through June 2018, and Rabbi Arturo Kalfus from July 2018 through June 2020.

On July 1, 2020, Rabbi Rebecca Hoffman became the senior rabbi at TAS Northridge. Rabbi Hoffman, a native of the San Fernando Valley, is a graduate of the University of California at San Diego, where she majored in Judaic studies. She earned a master's degree in education at American Jewish University and was ordained as a Reform rabbi through Hebrew Union College-Jewish Institute of Religion. The cantorial soloist is Elizabeth Kerstein and Chelsea Rabinovitz, M.A. is the Religious School director. 

Rabbis in the larger Jewish community whose families were members of TAS Northridge and who spent part or all of their formative years at the synagogue are: Liora Alban, Benjamin Berger, Shawna Brynjegard-Bialik, Leah Doberne-Schor, Jason Gwasdoff, Jonathan Klein, Adam Lutz, Dalia Samansky, Lisa Vernon and Rebeccah Birken Yussman. Cantor Rachel Goldman also grew up at TAS Northridge.

Activities
Temple Ahavat Shalom Northridge is a full-service congregation. Hebrew school, Sunday school, youth choir, and bar and bat mitzvah training are available for children of elementary- and middle-school age. The synagogue youth group is known as TASTY, for Temple Ahavat Shalom Temple Youth. Confirmation is celebrated by students in the 11th grade, who are also invited to take part in an annual educational trip to Washington, DC.

Social action and adult education programs take place throughout the year. These include Sisterhood, MoTAS (Men of Temple Ahavat Shalom), weekly Torah study, adult and youth choirs, a Caring Community to assist congregants who are ill, bereaved or otherwise in need, collection of food items and other goods for deserving individuals or families, periodic blood drives, and a monthly book discussion group. The temple's Social Action/Social Justice Committee is assisting with the resettlement of one Ukrainian and three Afghan families living in the San Fernando Valley and has compiled a list of non-profit organizations in support of Ukraine. 

Rabbi Hoffman led temple members on a tour of Israel from October 23 through November 3, 2022.

With social distancing in place since mid-March 2020 due to Covid-19, Hebrew and Sunday school classes, religious services, auxiliary meetings, weekly Torah study and other activities took place remotely via Zoom. By spring 2021, as immunizations increased and the rate of Covid infections in Southern California waned, the temple began to offer outdoor Shabbat services with mask-wearing and social distancing, in addition to live-streaming of services on Facebook. Services inside the sanctuary resumed in July 2021 but were temporarily switched to a virtual format from December 2021 through February 2022 during a surge of Omicron variant cases.

References 

Northridge, Los Angeles
Reform synagogues in California